Spodnja Orlica is a dispersed settlement in the Pohorje Hills south of Vuhred in the Municipality of Radlje ob Dravi in Slovenia.

History
Spodnja Orlica was established as a separate settlement in 1994, when the former village of Orlica was split into Spodnja Orlica and Zgornja Orlica (in the neighboring Municipality of Ribnica na Pohorju).

References

External links
Spodnja Orlica on Geopedia

Populated places in the Municipality of Radlje ob Dravi